The 2019 Neom Beach Soccer Cup is an international beach soccer tournament approved by the FIFA and held in the Saudi Arabia’s city of Neom from 17 to 20 July 2019 in beaches of the Red Sea coast.

Teams 
There are six teams are participating in the tournament; England, China, Egypt, UAE, Oman and Saudi Arabia. It is separated into two groups as follows:

The winner of each group will meet in the final to contest the title of the tournament, while the second of each group will meet for the third, and the third of each group will play for the fifth place.

Results 
Source: Beach Soccer, Neom Beach Soccer Cup 2019 
 

On 20 July 2019, Oman and Egypt played the final match. With the final result of 5-4, Oman won the first edition of the 2019 NEOM Beach Soccer Cup.

External links 

 Beach Soccer Worldwide

References 

Beach soccer competitions
2019 in beach soccer
2019 in Saudi Arabian sport